The 1997 Volta a Catalunya was the 77th edition of the Volta a Catalunya cycle race and was held from 19 June to 26 June 1997. The race started in Vila-seca and finished in Andorra la Vella. The race was won by Fernando Escartín of the Kelme team.

Teams
Thirteen teams started the race:

Route

General classification

References

1997
Volta
1997 in Spanish road cycling
June 1997 sports events in Europe